Louis Marie Jules Delapchier (19 October 1878 – 30 June 1959) was a French sculptor. His work was part of the sculpture event in the art competition at the 1924 Summer Olympics.

References

1878 births
1959 deaths
19th-century French sculptors
20th-century French sculptors
20th-century French male artists
French male sculptors
Olympic competitors in art competitions
People from Seine-Saint-Denis
Burials at Ivry Cemetery
19th-century French male artists